Iléṣà Dynamos F.C. is a Nigerian football club, in the town of Iléṣà, in Osun State. They play in the third level of professional football in Nigeria, the Nigeria Amateur League Division 1.
After finishing 2nd in their second division group in 2010, they were promoted to balance fixtures in the Amateur Division I when other teams could not make their games.

They were involved in a melee in July 2011 that led to five life bans and their ground banned from being used after fans and players attacked referees after a league game. The bans were commuted in February 2012 after they were relegated back to the second division.

Current squad

External links
Roster/pictures from COD United game March 2011
NFF slams life ban on five

Football clubs in Nigeria
Ilesha
Sports clubs in Nigeria